L'enfant prodigue (The Prodigal Son) is a scène lyrique or cantata in one act by Claude Debussy with a text by Édouard Guinand. The cantata premiered in Paris on June 27, 1884 as part of the Prix de Rome for composition competition which was awarded to Debussy with this piece by 22 out of 28 votes. The prize win garnered Debussy a scholarship to the Académie des Beaux-Arts, which included a four-year residence at the Villa Medici, the French Academy in Rome, to further his studies (1885-1887).

The soloists at its first performance were Rose Caron (Lia), Ernest Van Dyck (Azaël), and  Émile-Alexandre Taskin (Siméon).

The later version of 1907 was reorchestrated with the help of André Caplet and the premiere of this version took place at the Sheffield Music Festival in 1908, conducted by Henry Wood.  In 2021 George Morton created a chamber version of the work (for 10 musicians) for performances by Opera on Location in Sheffield.  

Although the work was never intended to be staged, it has on occasion been presented as a one-act opera.

Synopsis
At sunrise Lia (soprano) laments the absence of Azaël (tenor), her prodigal son, an outcast after leaving his home to pursue the world's pleasures. Siméon (baritone) is weary of her constant thinking of Azaël. After the appearance and dance of young villagers, Azaël enters, and is joyfully reunited with his mother. She urges Siméon to forgive and welcome him home which he does, calling for a feast of celebration and singing praises to God.

Music
 Prélude
 Air : "L'année, en vain chasse l'année ; Azaël, pourquoi m'as-tu quittée?"
 Récit : "Eh bien, encor des pleurs !"
 Cortège et Air de danse
 Récit et Air : "Ces airs joyeux ; O temps, à jamais effacé"
 Récit et Air : "Je m'enfuis"
 Duo : "Rouvre les yeux à la lumière"
 Air : "Mon fils est revenu ; Plus de vains soucis"
 Trio : "Mon cœur renaît à l’espérance"

References

Holland, Bernard, "Prodigal Son and a Brat, a Whimsical Pairing", New York Times, 10 December 2004.
Sosland, Benjamin, "Realism Mixed With Dadaism Adds Spark to Opera Double Bill", The Juilliard Journal, Vol. XX No. 4, December 2004.
Trezise, Simon, The Cambridge companion to Debussy, Cambridge University Press, 2003, pp. 63–64. 

Cantatas
Compositions by Claude Debussy
1884 compositions